The 1973–74 Rheinlandliga was the 22nd season of the highest amateur class of the Rhineland Football Association under the name of 1. Amateurliga Rheinland. It was a predecessor of today's Rheinlandliga.

Results
Rhineland champion was SV Leiwen. With the introduction of the two-division 2nd soccer Bundesliga this season, there were no newcomers from the amateur league. SV Leiwen represented Rhineland in the 1974 German Soccer Amateur Championship and lost in the first round to ASV Herzogenaurach (Bavaria).

SV Speicher, VfB Lützel, Alemannia Plaidt and FV Engers had to move down to the 2. Amateur league. For the following 1974–75 season, Ahrweiler BC, TuS Bad Marienberg and FC Bitburg moved up from the 2. A mature league, as well as a descendants from the Regional league, TuS Neuendorf and Sportfreunde Eisbachtal.

References

1974 in association football
Football in Rhineland-Palatinate
1973 in association football